St Augustine of Canterbury Catholic Academy (formerly St Augustine of Canterbury Catholic High School) is a Roman Catholic coeducational secondary school. It is located in the Blackbrook area of St Helens, Merseyside, England. The school is named after Augustine of Canterbury, the first Archbishop of Canterbury.

Previously a voluntary aided school administered by St Helens Metropolitan Borough Council, in April 2022 St Augustine of Canterbury Catholic High School converted to academy status and was renamed St Augustine of Canterbury Catholic Academy. The school is now sponsored by the St Joseph Catholic Multi Academy Trust, but continues to be under the jurisdiction of the Roman Catholic Archdiocese of Liverpool.

St Augustine of Canterbury Catholic Academy has approximately 600 pupils whose ages range from 11 to 16 and approximately 70 members of staff. The school offers GCSEs and BTECs as programmes of study for pupils.

References

External links
St Augustine of Canterbury Catholic Academy official website

Secondary schools in St Helens, Merseyside
Catholic secondary schools in the Archdiocese of Liverpool
Academies in St Helens, Merseyside